The Ministry of Interior of Pakistan has banned a number of organizations that have been proscribed as terrorist organizations under the Anti-Terrorism Act 1997.

List
Groups that are banned .

 Lashkar-e-Jhangvi
 Sipah-e-Muhammad Pakistan
 Sipah-e-Sahaba Pakistan
 Tehreek-e-Jafaria (Pakistan)
 Jaish-e-Muhammad
 Haji Namdar Group
 Tehreek-i-Taliban Pakistan
 Islami Tehreek Pakistan
 Tehreek-e-Nafaz-e-Shariat-e-Mohammadi
 Al-Qa'ida
 Ansar ul Islam
 Hizb ut-Tahrir
 Balochistan Liberation Army
 Balochistan Liberation Front
 Lashkar-e-Balochistan
 Balochistan Liberation United Front
 Peoples' Aman Committee
 Al-Haramain Foundation
 Rabita Trust
 Baloch Republican Party
 Balochistan United Army
 East Turkemenistan Islamic Movement
 Islamic Movement of Uzbekistan
 Islamic Jihad Union
 Baloch Student Organization Azad
 United Baloch Army
 Jeay Sindh Muttahida Mahaz
 Islamic State (Daish/ISIL/IS/ISIS)
 Jamaat-ul-Ahrar
 Tehreek-e-Azaadi Jammu and Kashmir
 Jundallah
 Falah-e-Insaniat Foundation
 Pak Turk International CAG Education Foundation
 Balochistan RaajiAjoi-R-Sangar
 Jeay Sindh Quami Mahaz- Aresar Group
 Sindhu Desh Liberation Army
 Ghazi Force

See also
 Terrorism in Pakistan
 List of terrorist incidents in Pakistan
 National Counter Terrorism Authority
 Counter Terrorism Department
 Rangers Anti-Terrorism Wing

References

External links
 Official list

 
Lists of organisations based in Pakistan